The 3rd constituency of Jász-Nagykun-Szolnok County is one of the single member constituencies of the National Assembly, the national legislature of Hungary. The constituency standard abbreviation: Jász-Nagykun-Szolnok 03. OEVK.

Since 2018, it has been represented by Sándor Kovács of the Fidesz–KDNP party alliance.

Geography
The 3rd constituency is located in eastern part of Jász-Nagykun-Szolnok County.

The constituency borders with 7th constituency of Borsod-Abaúj-Zemplén County to the north, 5th constituency of Hajdú-Bihar County to the east, 2nd constituency of Békés County to the southeast, 4th constituency to the southwest, 1st and 2nd constituency to the west, 3rd and 1st constituency of Heves County to the northwest.

List of municipalities
The constituency includes the following municipalities:

History
The 3rd constituency of Jász-Nagykun-Szolnok County was created in 2011 and contained parts of the pre-2011 abolished constituencies of 7th and 8th of this County. Its borders have not changed since its creation.

Members
The constituency was first represented by Sándor Fazekas of the Fidesz from 2014 to 2018. Sándor F. Kovács of the Fidesz was elected in 2018 and 2022.

Election result

2022 election

2018 election

2014 election

References

Jasz-Nagykun-Szolnok 3rd